Coleophora rhanteriella is a moth of the family Coleophoridae. It is found in Algeria, Libya and Tunisia.

The larvae feed on Rhanterium abpressum. They feed on the leaves of their host plant.

References

rhanteriella
Moths of Africa
Moths described in 1915